The 2022–23 season is Al-Taawoun's 67th year in their history and 13th consecutive season in the Pro League. The club will participate in the Pro League, and the King Cup.

The season covers the period from 1 July 2022 to 30 June 2023.

Players

Squad information

Out on loan

Transfers and loans

Transfers in

Loans in

Transfers out

Loans out

Pre-season

Competitions

Overview

Goalscorers

Last Updated: 17 March 2023

Assists

Last Updated: 17 March 2023

Clean sheets

Last Updated: 2 February 2023

References

Al-Taawoun FC seasons
Taawoun